Forbes was an electoral district of the Legislative Assembly in the Australian state of New South Wales, created in 1880, replacing Lachlan, and named after and including Forbes. In 1894, with the abolition of multi-member electorates, it was abolished and replaced by Lachlan and Condoublin.

Members for Forbes

Election results

References

Former electoral districts of New South Wales
1859 establishments in Australia
1894 disestablishments in Australia
Constituencies established in 1859
Constituencies disestablished in 1894